Ernő Killer (1881 – 12 December 1926) was a Hungarian rower. He competed in the men's single sculls event at the 1908 Summer Olympics.

References

External links
 

1881 births
1926 deaths
Hungarian male rowers
Olympic rowers of Hungary
Rowers at the 1908 Summer Olympics
Sportspeople from Fejér County